Yulia Razenkova is a road cyclist from Russia. She represented her nation at the 2005 UCI Road World Championships.

References

External links
 profile at Procyclingstats.com

1975 births
Russian female cyclists
Living people
Place of birth missing (living people)